Thomas Swinarton (May 21, 1821 - December 21, 1893) was an Ontario businessman and political figure. He represented Cardwell in the Legislative Assembly of Ontario from 1867 to 1871 as a Conservative.

Swinarton came to Upper Canada from County Down, Ireland. He served as reeve of Albion Township for 9 years and lived in Coventry. He was also warden for Peel County in 1881. Swinarton operated a gristmill, carding mill and sawmill, as well as a tannery and general store. He defeated George McManus in 1867 when he was elected in Cardwell.

References 
 A History of Peel County to Mark its Centenary as a Separate County 1867-1967, for the Corporation of the County of Peel (1967)

External links 

The Canadian parliamentary companion, HJ Morgan (1869)

1821 births
1893 deaths
Politicians from County Down
Irish emigrants to pre-Confederation Ontario
Progressive Conservative Party of Ontario MPPs